A great seal is a seal used by a head of state, or someone authorised to do so on their behalf, to confirm formal documents, such as laws, treaties, appointments and letters of dispatch. It was and is used as a guarantee of the authenticity of the most important and solemn records and documents.

In the Middle Ages, the great seal played a far greater political role and there was much real power associated with having control over the seal. In addition to the great seal, a prince usually also had a privy seal, used for correspondence of a more private nature.

The seal is usually formally entrusted upon an office-holder to act as keeper of the seal. This keeper may be a separate office but was also usually combined with that of the chancellor.  Nowadays, the great seal is usually entrusted upon a minister, particularly a minister of justice.

Design 
Great seals of republics usually show the nation's coat of arms (e.g. the Great Seal of the United States) or an allegorical image (e.g. France). For this reason, the design used usually remains unchanged. The seals themselves may, however, be replaced because of wear depending on how often the seal is used. In monarchies, by contrast, the great seal is often changed some time after the accession of a new monarch as the seal often depicts the reigning monarch in full form.

By country 

Current countries
 Bundesadler (Germany)
 Great Seal of Canada
 Great Seal of Ontario
 Great Seal of France
 Great Seal of the State (Greece)
 Seal of the President of Ireland
 Seal of New Zealand
 Great Seal of the Realm (United Kingdom)
 Great Seal of Northern Ireland
 Great Seal of Scotland
 Welsh Seal
 Great Seal of the State (Peru)
 Great Seal of the Philippines
 Great Seal of the United States
 National Seal of the Republic of Korea
 National Seals of the Republic of China
 National seals of Japan
 

Historic seals
Great Seal of the Commonwealth (1655)
 Seal of the Confederate States
 Public Seal of Hong Kong, the official seal prior to the transfer of sovereignty of Hong Kong
 Great Seal of the Irish Free State
Great Seal of the Netherlands
 The Seal of Solomon is often referred to as the Great Seal

References

See also 
 Privy seal, term sometimes used for the monarch's personal seal.
 Keeper of the Seals, the person to whom a great seal may be officially entrusted with.

Seals (insignia)
Authentication methods